Stenocactus pentacanthus (Echinofossulocactus pentacanthus) is a cactus native  to Central Mexico.  It can grow to 8 cm (3 ¼ inches) in diameter.  The plant is greyish-green in colour with 30 to 40 wavy-edge ribs with few areoles.  Its flowering period is normally during spring. These flowers can grow to 2 cm (3.4 inches) long. The flowers are whitish with a pale purple mid-stripe.  They enjoy full sun and need a minimum temperature of 10 °C (50 °F).

References

Cacti of Mexico
Cactoideae